Asytesta doriae is a species of beetles belonging to the family Curculionidae.

Taxonomy
Asytesta  is now considered a senior synonym of Zygara and Zygara doriae is returned to its original combination with Asytesta.

Etymology
The Latin species name doriae has been dedicated to the Italian naturalist Giacomo Doria by the German entomologist Theodor Franz Wilhelm Kirsch.

Distribution
This species is endemic to the Papua New Guinea and is known only from the Yule Island.

Description
Body is sub-globular, longer than broad, with a deep basal row of puncture on the elytra, a serrate prefemoral tooth, and light reddish-brown antennae and tarsi.

References 

Cryptorhynchinae
Insects of Papua New Guinea
Endemic fauna of Papua New Guinea
Beetles described in 1879